Patrick J. Scanlon (December 29, 1861 – July 17, 1913) was a Major League Baseball outfielder. He played for the 1884 Boston Reds in the Union Association.

Sources

Major League Baseball outfielders
Boston Reds (UA) players
Baseball players from Massachusetts
19th-century baseball players
Holyoke (minor league baseball) players
1861 births
1913 deaths
Baseball people from Nova Scotia
Sportspeople from Halifax, Nova Scotia